Dennis Cirkin (born 6 April, 2002) is a professional footballer who plays as a left-back for Championship club Sunderland. He is a youth international for England.

Club career
Cirkin was born in Dublin, Ireland to parents from Latvia and the family then moved to London when he was three years old. He attended Wanstead High School while signed to the Tottenham Hotspur academy. On 11 August, 2021, Cirkin joined Sunderland for an undisclosed fee. On 14 August, 2021, Cirkin made his debut for Sunderland in an away game against Milton Keynes Dons which Sunderland won 2–1.

International career
In November 2018, Cirkin was sent off for the England under-17 team in an away game against the Republic of Ireland. Having represented England at U16, U17 and U18 level, Cirkin made his debut for the England U20s during a 6–1 victory over Romania U20s at St. George's Park on 6 September, 2021.

Career statistics

Honours

Sunderland
 EFL League One play-offs: 2022

References

External links
Soccerway profile

2002 births
Living people
Association footballers from Dublin (city)
English footballers
England youth international footballers
Republic of Ireland association footballers
English people of Latvian descent
Irish people of Latvian descent
Irish emigrants to the United Kingdom
Tottenham Hotspur F.C. players
Sunderland A.F.C. players
Association football defenders